Fenamidone is a foliar fungicide used on grapes, ornamentals, potatoes, tobacco, and vegetables such as tomatoes. It exerts its fungicidal effects by acting as a Qo inhibitor.

References

Fungicides